Saša Aleksander Živec (born 2 April 1991) is a Slovenian professional footballer who plays as a winger for Zagłębie Lubin.

Club career

Primorje
On 16 July 2010, Živec made his Slovenian PrvaLiga debut for Primorje in a 4–1 away defeat to Koper. On 29 August 2010, he scored his first league goal and Primorje's fifth in a 5–1 home win over Olimpija Ljubljana. Živec netted his second goal of the season as he scored the winning strike in a 1–0 away victory over Rudar Velenje on 7 May 2011. He made 31 league appearances during the 2010–11 season, but Primorje finished last and was relegated to the Slovenian Second League.

CSKA Sofia
On 14 June 2011, Živec joined CSKA Sofia on a three-year contract for an undisclosed fee believed to be around €100,000. On 16 July 2011, he scored his first goal for CSKA Sofia in a friendly match against Cracovia Krakow. Živec made his competitive debut for the club on 30 July 2011, appearing as a substitute in a 3–1 win in the 2011 Bulgarian Supercup against Litex Lovech. He spent most of his time with CSKA on the bench and his contract was terminated by mutual consent on 29 November 2011.

Domžale
After breaking his contract with CSKA Sofia, Živec returned to his native Slovenia and on 9 February 2012 joined Domžale on a two-and-a-half-year contract. Živec made his competitive debut for the club on 10 March 2012 in a 2–1 defeat against Maribor and also scored his debut goal for the team. On 17 March 2012, Živec scored again in a 2–1 home defeat against his former youth club Gorica. Just four days later he scored again, this time in a 4–3 victory over Mura 05. He opened the 2012–13 season with a 2–1 away victory over Olimpija Ljubljana, in which he scored both goals for his team.

Omonia
On 4 July 2018, Živec signed for Cypriot First Division club AC Omonia.

Zagłębie Lubin
On 27 June 2019, Živec returned to Ekstraklasa by signing with Zagłębie Lubin. He made his debut for the club on 26 July 2019 in a 1–0 defeat to Górnik Zabrze. He scored his first goal for Zagłębie on 10 August 2019 against Arka Gdynia.

International career 
On 3 September 2020, Živec made his senior international debut for Slovenia against Greece in the 2020–21 UEFA Nations League.

References

External links
Player profile at NZS 

1991 births
Living people
People from Šempeter pri Gorici
Slovenian footballers
Slovenia youth international footballers
Slovenia under-21 international footballers
Slovenia international footballers
Association football wingers
Slovenian expatriate footballers
NK Primorje players
PFC CSKA Sofia players
NK Domžale players
ND Gorica players
Piast Gliwice players
Latina Calcio 1932 players
AC Omonia players
Zagłębie Lubin players
Slovenian Second League players
Slovenian PrvaLiga players
First Professional Football League (Bulgaria) players
Ekstraklasa players
II liga players
Cypriot First Division players
Slovenian expatriate sportspeople in Bulgaria
Expatriate footballers in Bulgaria
Slovenian expatriate sportspeople in Poland
Expatriate footballers in Poland
Slovenian expatriate sportspeople in Italy
Expatriate footballers in Italy
Slovenian expatriate sportspeople in Cyprus
Expatriate footballers in Cyprus